FK Kolubara is a professional football club based in Lazarevac, Serbia. They compete in the Serbian SuperLiga, the top tier of the national league system.

History
During the existence of SFR Yugoslavia, the club spent two consecutive seasons in the Second League (1983–84 and 1984–85), but mainly competed in the lower regional leagues. They would make their debut in the second tier of FR Yugoslavia football during the NATO bombing-shortened 1998–99 season, finishing fifth in Group East. The club spent three more years in the Second League (1999–2002), before suffering relegation to the Serbian League Belgrade. They achieved their biggest success by reaching the semi-finals of the 2005–06 Serbia and Montenegro Cup, losing 4–1 away at OFK Beograd. After spending six seasons in the third tier, the club won the 2007–08 Serbian League Belgrade and took promotion to the Serbian First League. They competed in the second tier for the next five years, controversially missing promotion to the top flight in the last round of the 2009–10 Serbian First League, eventually finishing in third place. In the 2020–21 Serbian First League, the club earned promotion to the Serbian SuperLiga for the first time in history.

Honours
Serbian League Belgrade (Tier 3)
 2007–08, 2013–14
Belgrade Zone League (Tier 4)
 2003–04

Seasons

Notes

Players

First-team squad

Out on loan

Notable players
This is a list of players who have played at full international level.

  Nemanja Nikolić
  Dragan Čadikovski
  Marko Grujić
  Saša Jovanović
  Nemanja Matić
  Bogdan Mladenović
  Saša Kovačević
  Radovan Radaković
  Zoran Ranković
  Nikola Trajković
  Saša Zorić
  Nikola Žigić

For a list of all FK Kolubara players with a Wikipedia article, see :Category:FK Kolubara players.

Club Officials

Managerial history

References

External links
 
 Club page at Srbijasport

 
1919 establishments in Serbia
Association football clubs established in 1919
Football clubs in Belgrade
Sport in Lazarevac